Axel de Vries (4 June 1892 Preedi Manor (now Järva Parish), Kreis Jerwen – 24 January 1963 Bonn, West Germany) was a Baltic-German and German politician. He was a member of II Riigikogu. He was a member of the Riigikogu since 9 April 1924. He replaced Gerhard Kress.

After WW II, he was a member of Bundestag.

References

1892 births
1963 deaths
People from Järva Parish
People from Kreis Jerwen
Baltic-German people
German-Baltic Party politicians
Free Democratic Party (Germany) politicians
Members of the Riigikogu, 1923–1926
Members of the Bundestag for Baden-Württemberg
German journalists
Revalsche Zeitung editors
20th-century Freikorps personnel
German military personnel of World War I
Estonian emigrants to Germany